The Al Ma'wa Wildlife Reserve in Jerash province north of Amman was established in 2011 by the Princess Alia Foundation in partnership with the international animal welfare organisation Four Paws. It is the largest sanctuary for rescued and mistreated wildlife in the Middle East.

Al Ma'wa is located in Jerash, 48 kilometres north of the capital city Amman and covers 140 hectares, that is donated by the Jordanian Agriculture Ministry, The reserve has built habitats for large cats and bears. In December 2020, Four Paws transferred two Himalayan brown bears from Marghazar Zoo.

References

External links
 Al Ma'wa for Nature and Wildlife Official Website

Animal sanctuaries